Beacon Theatre may refer to:

 Beacon Theatre (New York City)
 Beacon Theatre (Beacon, New York)
 Beacon Theatre (Boston)
 Beacon Theatre (Hopewell, Virginia)
 a longtime former name of the Pantages Theatre (Vancouver)

See also
Beacon Theatre: Live From New York, album by Joe Bonamassa
 Beacon Theatres, Inc. v. Westover, a U.S. Supreme Court case decided in 1959

Lists of theatres